Kambiwá ( Cambioá) is an extinct unclassified language of Brazil. A couple dozen words were collected by Wilbur Pickering during the 1960s from two people living in Barreira, Petrolândia, Pernambuco. However, by that time the language had become extinct.

Classification
Apart from two apparent borrowings, none of the words are relatable to known languages. Loukotka (1968) characterized the language as unclassifiable due to lack of data.

Vocabulary
In 1961, two word lists of Kambiwá were collected by Wilbur Pickering from elderly rememberers in Barreira, Petrolândia, Pernambuco. The word lists are published in Meader (1978).

Word list recorded from Manoel de Souza:

{| class="wikitable sortable"
! Portuguese gloss (original) !! English gloss (translated) !! Kambiwá
|-
| bebê indígena || indigenous baby || ˈkɔ́lúmì
|-
| fogo || fire || ˈtóὶ
|-
| fumo || smoke || ˈpɔ́ṛ̃ùi
|-
| mulher || woman || ˈšíˈtúrù
|-
| cachimbo || smoking pipe || ˈkákwì / ˈkwákwì
|-
| gado || cattle || ˈkǫ́ną̀
|-
| homem branco (estrangeiro) || white man (stranger) || ˈtš̭yářίtš̭yà
|-
| negro || black man || tãˑˈkážúpì
|-
| ovelha || sheep || ˈtyápɔsεřε̨
|-
| peba || drink || ˈr̃úpʌ̨̀ų̀
|-
| porco-do-mato || collared peccary (Pecari tajacu) || ˈtų́pàřà
|-
| raposa || fox || ˈfɔ́iàsà
|-
| tamanduá || tamandua || ˈfílípį̀
|-
| tatu-bola || Brazilian three-banded armadillo (Tolypeutes tricinctus) || ˈkʌ̨́ñíkį̀
|}

Word list recorded from an elderly man named Tenoro:

{| class="wikitable sortable"
! Portuguese gloss (original) !! English gloss (translated) !! Kambiwá
|-
| fogo || fire || břázádò
|-
| fumo || smoke || pą̃ˈ húì
|-
| abelha || bee || ˈkóìm
|-
| água corrente || running water || bibi / ε
|-
| bebida alcoólica indígena feita de jurema-preta || indigenous liquor made from black jurema (Mimosa tenuiflora) || ʌ̨́žúˈkà
|-
| bebida alcoólica indígena feita de murici || indigenous liquor made from murici (Byrsonima crassifolia) || álúˈà
|-
| besta || beast || ˈtš̭yápàřú
|-
| homem branco || white man || ˈnεkřu
|-
| ovelha || sheep || púsέˈrὲ̨
|-
| peba || six-banded armadillo (Euphractus sexcinctus) || ˈgwášínì
|-
| porco-do-mato || collared peccary (Pecari tajacu) || pǫį
|-
| veado || deer || ˈgwą́wų̀
|}

Kambiwá words provided by each informant that differ from each other:

{| class="wikitable"
! Portuguese !! English !! Manoel de Souza !! Tenoro
|-
| fogo || fire || ˈtóὶ || břázádò (loanword?)
|-
| fumo || smoke || ˈpɔ́ṛ̃ùi || pą̃ˈ húì
|-
| ovelha || sheep || ˈtyápɔsεřε̨ || púsέˈrὲ̨
|-
| porco-do-mato || peccary || ˈtų́pàřà || pǫį
|}

References

 Meader, R. E. 1978. Indios do nordeste. Levantamento sobre os remanescentes tribais do nordeste brasileiro. SIL Internacional. pp 65–92.
 Fabre, Alain (2005): "Kambiwá" (Diccionario etnolingüístico y guía bibliográfica de los pueblos indígenas sudamericanos)

Unclassified languages of South America
Indigenous languages of Northeastern Brazil